Richland Township is a township in Barton County, Missouri, USA.  As of the 2000 census, its population was 611.

Richland Township was so named on account of their fertile soil.

Geography

The streams of Dorris Creek, Little Coon Creek and West Fork Spring River run through this township.

References

 USGS Geographic Names Information System (GNIS)

External links
 US-Counties.com
 City-Data.com

Townships in Barton County, Missouri
Townships in Missouri